David Luong is a Senior Cinematic Video Game Artist Level 2 at Blizzard Entertainment, with work ranging from 3D lighting to compositing to digital matte painting. He graduated from the Academy of Art University in 2005 with a Bachelor of Fine Arts degree. He has worked on major cinematic scenes for Blizzard's AAA game titles such as World of Warcraft, Diablo 3, Starcraft 2, and Hearthstone from 2006 to the present. David Luong has made significant contributions to the matte painting community, and his work has garnered many fans.

Background 
Luong began working in the visual effects industry in 2006. While growing up, he played numerous games such as The Legend of Zelda, Super Mario Bros, Final Fantasy, and Dragon Quest and watched movies such as The Neverending Story, Jurassic Park, Terminator 2, The Matrix, and Lord of the Rings, all of which have eventually cultivated him as an artist and inspired him to become a video game artist himself. In high school, he used Adobe Photoshop working for a journalism class. He learned how to design graphic headers and worked as the online editor for The North Star newspaper. In 2005, Luong graduated from The Academy of Art University in San Francisco with a Bachelor of Fine Arts degree emphasizing 3D Animation and Visual Effects. During his studies, he learned color theory, particle FX, lighting, compositing, and matte painting.

Career 
After Luong graduated from The Academy of Art University, he worked at Disney Toon Studios for a period of time, followed by Luma Pictures in Santa Monica, and on to Rhythm & Hues, a studio of Oscar fame. In 2006, he joined Blizzard Entertainment. Luong has worked on all Blizzard franchises, including Starcraft, Diablo, and World of Warcraft. At Blizzard, his works ranged from matte painting to lighting and compositing.

Teaching 
Luong has taught CGSociety's online Matte Painting class since 2008.

Video games worked on 
 World of Warcraft: Battle for Azeroth
 Overwatch
 Diablo 3: Reaper of Souls
 Hearthstone
 World of Warcraft: Mists of Panderia
 Starcraft 2: Heart of the Swarm
 World of Warcraft: Cataclysm
 Starcraft 2: Wings of Liberty
 World of Warcraft: Wrath of the Lich King

Source:

Publications 
Luong co-authored the book D'artiste Matte Painting 3: Digital Artists Master Class with Damien Mace and Milan Schere.

References

References 
 Uesugi, Y. et al., 2008. d'artiste Matte Painting 2. Adelaide, SA, AUS: Ballistic Publishing. 
 Luong, D. et al., 2013. d'artiste Matte Painting 3. Adelaide, SA, AUS: Ballistic Publishing. 
 Luong, D. et al., 2009. The Cinematic Art of World of Warcraft: The Wrath of the Lich King.

External links 
 
 Official website of David Luong

Living people
Academy of Art University alumni
Year of birth missing (living people)